Zenon Licznerski (born 27 November 1954 in Elbląg) is a Polish former athlete who competed mainly in the 100 metres.

He was Polish 100/200 metre champion in 1976, 77.

He was a member of the Polish sprint relay team that won Gold in the European championship.

He competed for Poland in the 1980 Summer Olympics held in Moscow, Soviet Union he competed in the 200 metres, where he reached the quarter final. Afterward he was a member in the 4 x 100 metre relay where he won the silver medal with his teammates Krzysztof Zwoliński, Leszek Dunecki and Marian Woronin.

See also
Polish records in athletics

External links
 
 European Championships

1954 births
Living people
Polish male sprinters
People from Elbląg
Olympic silver medalists for Poland
Athletes (track and field) at the 1976 Summer Olympics
Athletes (track and field) at the 1980 Summer Olympics
Olympic athletes of Poland
European Athletics Championships medalists
Sportspeople from Warmian-Masurian Voivodeship
Medalists at the 1980 Summer Olympics
Olympic silver medalists in athletics (track and field)
Lechia Gdańsk athletes
20th-century Polish people